The South African Airplay Chart ranks the best-performing singles in South Africa. Its data, published by Entertainment Monitoring Africa, is based collectively on each single's weekly airplay.

List of number-one singles of 2013

Number-one artists

See also
2016 in music
Entertainment Monitoring Africa

References

South Africa
Number-one singles
2013